The Fatal Discovery is a 1769 tragedy by the British writer John Home.

The original cast included Spranger Barry as Ronan, Samuel Reddish as Orellan, Francis Aickin as Connan, John Palmer as Durstan, Thomas Jefferson as Kathul, James Aickin as Euran and Ann Street Barry as Rivine.

References

Bibliography
 Nicoll, Allardyce. A History of English Drama 1660–1900: Volume III. Cambridge University Press, 2009.
 Hogan, C.B (ed.) The London Stage, 1660–1800: Volume V. Southern Illinois University Press, 1968.

1769 plays
Tragedy plays
West End plays
Plays by John Home